Heer Ranjha is a 2013 Pakistani romance drama television serial based on the book of same name by Waris Shah, aired on PTV Home. The program is directed by Shahid Zahoor and written by Ahmed Aqeel Ruby. It first aired on 2 February 2013. The serial stars Ahsan Khan, Zaria Butt, Shafqat Cheema, Sohail Sameer, Sadia Faisal, Saba Faisal, Mohsin Gillani, Masood Akhtar and Afzal Khan.

Cast
 Ahsan Khan as Ranjha
 Zaria Butt as Heer
 Shafqat Cheema as Kedo
 Sohail Sameer as Murad
 Sadia Faisal as Sehti
 Saba Faisal as Heer's mother
 Mohsin Gillani as Heer's father
 Masood Akhtar as Ranjha's father
 Kinza Malik as Rani
 Beena Chaudhary as Bakhta
 Afzal Khan

References

External links 
 

Pakistan Television Corporation original programming
Pakistani drama television series
2013 Pakistani television series debuts
Works based on folklore
Heer Ranjha